Eliana Alexander is a Mexican actress. She portrayed the role of Rita Thomas on My Network TV's Desire.

Filmography

 Agenda (2007) .... Magdalena Linney
 Desire (2006) .... Rita Thomas
 Madam Marina (2005)  .... Marina
 Ley del silencio, La (2005) (mini) TV Series .... Amparo
 How the Garcia Girls Spent Their Summer (2005) .... Nora
 All God's Creatures (2002) .... Stenographer
 Llorona del río, La (2001) .... Lupita
 A Family in Crisis: The Elian Gonzales Story (2000) .... Delores
 The Bold and the Beautiful .... (1999) Suzie
 Beverly Hills, 90210 (1999) .... Maria Alvarez
 Mad TV (1999) .... Maria
 Ángeles (1999) .... Patricia
 Kiss of a Stranger (1999) .... Angela
 My Father's Love (1999) .... Maria's Mother
 Second Skin (1998) .... Jolie
 Foto Novelas: Mangas (1997) .... Sister Maria
 Mr. Rhodes .... Cleaning Lady (1996)
 A Moment of Truth (1996)  .... Joey
 The O.J. Simpson Story (1995) .... Young Woman
 The Rockford Files: I Still Love L.A. (1994) .... Officer #1
 Mi Vida Loca (1993) .... Mousie's Mother
 Perfect Strangers .... (1991) Balki B. Flygirl
 Far Out Man (1990) (uncredited)  .... Dancer and Nurse
 It's Garry Shandling's Show (1988) .... Bridesmaid

External links

1969 births
Living people
Mexican television actresses
Mexican telenovela actresses
Actresses from Mexico City